Mire, or Mulgi, is an Afro-Asiatic language spoken in the southwestern Chadian prefectures of Tandjile Prefecture and Lai Prefecture. Most of the speakers, who generally practice traditional religions or Christianity, speak Ndam (65% lexical similarity) or Kimré (32% lexical similarity) as a second language.

References 

East Chadic languages
Languages of Chad
Endangered Afroasiatic languages